Fuentes de Béjar is a municipality located in the province of Salamanca, Castile and León, Spain.

See also
List of municipalities in Salamanca

References

Municipalities in the Province of Salamanca